Asi is a Turkish television drama revolving around the lives of Asi Kozcuoğlu and Demir Doğan in the rural town of Antakya. It ran on Kanal D from October 26, 2007 to June 19, 2009.

Series overview

{| class="wikitable" style="text-align: center;"
|-
! style="padding: 0 8px;" colspan="2" rowspan="2"| Season
! style="padding: 0 8px;" rowspan="2"| Episodes
! colspan="2"| Originally aired
|-
! Season premiere
! style="padding: 0 8px;"| Season finale
|-
 |style="background: #9797FF;"|
 |1
 |34
 |style="padding: 0 8px;"| 
 |style="padding: 0 8px;"| 
|-
 |style="background: #AE0000;"|
 |2
 |37
 |style="padding: 0 8px;"| 
 |style="padding: 0 8px;"| 
|}

Episodes

Season 1 (2007—2008)

Season 2 (2008—2009)

Lists of Turkish drama television series episodes